Sabri Kiraz (1918 – 12 January 1985) was a Turkish football manager. He managed the Turkish national team.

References

1918 births
1985 deaths
Turkish football managers
Fenerbahçe football managers
Göztepe S.K. managers
MKE Ankaragücü managers
Turkey national football team managers